Uroš Vukanović may refer to:

 Uroš I Vukanović, Grand Prince of Serbia (1112–1145)
 Uroš II Vukanović, Grand Prince of Serbia (1145–1162)

See also
 Uroš I (disambiguation)
 Uroš II (disambiguation)
 Stefan Uroš (disambiguation)
 Uroš Nemanjić (disambiguation)